Gubi may refer to:
Hübi, Azerbaijan
Gowji, Iran